John Berryman VC (18 July 1825 – 27 June 1896) was a British Army non-commissioned officer and a recipient of the Victoria Cross, the highest award for gallantry in the face of the enemy that can be awarded to British and Commonwealth forces.

Victoria Cross action
Born in Dudley, England, Berriman was 29 years old, and a Troop Sergeant-Major in the 17th Lancers (Duke of Cambridge's Own) during the Crimean War when the following deed took place for which he was awarded the VC.

On 25 October 1854 at Balaclava, Crimea, (see Charge of the Light Brigade) Troop Sergeant-Major Berryman, whose horse had been shot under him, stopped on the field with a wounded officer amidst a storm of shot and shell. Two sergeants (John Farrell and Joseph Malone) came to his assistance and between them they carried the wounded officer out of range of the guns.

Further information
Berryman later achieved the rank of major and transferred to the 5th Lancers in 1880.

He died at Woldingham, Surrey

References

External links
Location of grave and VC medal (Surrey)

1825 births
1896 deaths
People from Dudley
British recipients of the Victoria Cross
Crimean War recipients of the Victoria Cross
British Army personnel of the Crimean War
17th Lancers soldiers
17th Lancers officers
5th Royal Irish Lancers officers
British Army personnel of the Anglo-Zulu War
British Army recipients of the Victoria Cross
Military personnel from Worcestershire
Burials in Surrey